N'écoutez pas (English: Do Not Listen) is the third studio album by the Québécois band Fly Pan Am, credited on this album as Le Fly Pan Am. It was released by Constellation Records in September 2004.

The album was recorded and mixed, by Thierry Amar, at the Hotel2Tango in April 2004. It features long-time contributor Alexandre St-Onge helping with the fifth track.

The artwork was produced by the band. The liner notes include the album credits, mentions of guest musicians, and notes of gratitude.

Track listing 
 "Brûlez suivant, suivante!" ("Burn Next, Next") – 4:26
 "Ex éleveurs de renards argentés" ("Ex-Breeders of Silver Foxes") – 2:02
 "Autant zig-zag" ("As much Zig-Zag") – 11:02
 "Buvez nos larmes de métal" ("Drink Our Metal Tears") – 1:37
 "Pas à pas step until" ("Step Up to Step") – 5:26
 "..." – 2:12
 "Très très 'retro'" ("Very Very 'Retro") – 11:02
 "Vos rêves revers" ("Your Setback Dreams") – 6:04
 "Ce sale désir éfilé qui sortant de ma bouche" ("This Dirty Fringed Desire Out of My Mouth") – 3:08
 "Le faux pas aimer vous souhaite d'être follement ami" ("The Misstep Like You Want To Be Madly Friend") – 1:18

Personnel

Le Fly Pan Am 

 Jonathan Parant – guitar, organ, piano, vocals, electronics, tapes
 Felix Morel – drums, vocals, electronics, tapes
 Roger Tellier-Craig – guitar, organ, vocals, electronics, tapes
 J.S. Truchy – bass guitar, vocals, electronics, tapes
 Eric Gingras - guitar, organ, voice

Other musicians 

 Dominique Petrin – vocals (on "Très très 'retro'")
 Tim Hecker – electronics (on "Très très 'retro'")
 Catherine Lemay – vocals (on "...")
 Alexandre St-Onge – electronics (on "Pas à pas step until")
 Les Bonzai Kittens – vocals (on "Le faux pas aimer vous souhaite d'être follement ami")

Production 

 Thierry Amar – record producer, audio mixing
 Harris Newman – audio mastering

Notes

External links 
 Cstrecords.com, the official homepage of Constellation Records.

2004 albums
Constellation Records (Canada) albums
Fly Pan Am albums